Mironó District is a district (distrito) of Ngäbe-Buglé Comarca in Panama.

References 

Districts of Panama